Heterocompsa is a genus of beetles in the family Cerambycidae, containing the following species:

 Heterocompsa aquilonia Giesbert, 1998
 Heterocompsa eburata Martins, 1970
 Heterocompsa formosa (Martins, 1962)
 Heterocompsa geniculata (Thomson, 1865)
 Heterocompsa nigripes (Martins, 1962)
 Heterocompsa seabrai (Martins, 1962)
 Heterocompsa stellae (Martins, 1962)
 Heterocompsa truncaticornis (Martins, 1960)

References

Ibidionini